Mamadou Camara was the Minister of the Digital Economy, Information and Communication for the Government of Mali, from April 11, 2014 to January 2015.

References

Living people
Government ministers of Mali
Year of birth missing (living people)
21st-century Malian people